A hybrid image is an image that is perceived in one of two different ways, depending on viewing distance, based on the way humans process visual input. A technique for creating hybrid images exhibiting this optical illusion was developed by Aude Oliva of MIT and Philippe G. Schyns of University of Glasgow, a method they originally proposed in 1994. Hybrid images combine the low spatial frequencies of one picture with the high spatial frequencies of another picture, producing an image with an interpretation that changes with viewing distance.

Perhaps the most familiar example is one featuring Albert Einstein and Marilyn Monroe. Looking at the picture from a short distance, one can see a sharp image of Einstein, with only a hint of blurry distortion hinting at the presence of an overlaid image. Viewed from a distance in which the fine detail blurs, the unmistakable face of Monroe emerges.

See also
Optical illusions

References

External links
Hybrid Images 
Hybrid Imagery set on flickr
Hybrid Image generator

Optical illusions